Cydia amplana, the rusty oak moth, is a moth of the family Tortricidae. It is found from northern, central and southern Europe to Asia Minor, south-western Russia and Transcaucasus.

The wingspan is 16–20 mm. The forewings have a large, lighter dorsal spot and darker slashes at the tip. The larva is red, unlike the related species  Cydia splendana which has a white larva.

Adults are on wing in June and July. It often needs two years for development.

The larvae feed on Corylus, Juglans, Castanea, Fagus and Quercus species. The larvae usually only feed inside nuts that have fallen to the ground, but at times the larvae cause significant damage by causing the nuts to drop.

References

Grapholitini
Moths of Asia
Moths of Europe
Moths described in 1799
Taxa named by Jacob Hübner